The 2006 Africa Cup of Nations Final was a football match that took place on 10 February 2006 at the Cairo International Stadium in Cairo, Egypt to determine the winner of the 2006 Africa Cup of Nations, the football championship of African nations organised by the Confederation of African Football (CAF).

Egypt won their fifth-ever AFCON after defeating the Ivory Coast 4–2 on penalties.

By the time of this match, Egypt were 32nd in the FIFA World Rankings (5th in Africa), while the Ivory Coast were ranked 42nd (7th in Africa).

References

Final
2006
2006
2006
Africa Cup of Nations Final 2006
February 2006 sports events in Africa
2006 AFCON Final
2006 AFCON Final